The Institut du Monde Arabe (IMA) French for Arab World Institute, is an organisation founded in Paris in 1980 by France with 18 Arab countries to research and disseminate information about the Arab world and its cultural and spiritual values. The Institute was established as a result of a perceived lack of representation for the Arab world in France, and seeks to provide a secular location for the promotion of Arab civilization, art, knowledge, and aesthetics. Housed within the institution are a museum, library, auditorium, restaurant, offices and meeting rooms.

History
The AWI is located in a building known as the Institut du Monde Arabe, the same name as the institute, on Rue des Fossés Saint Bernard in the 5th arrondissement of Paris, France. Originally, the project was conceived in 1973 by President Valéry Giscard d'Estaing. The museum was constructed between 1981 and 1987 under the presidency of French President Francois Mitterrand as part of his urban development series entitled, the "Grands Projets." The Institute promotes cooperation and exchanges between France and the Arab nations, particularly in the areas of science and technology, contributing to the understanding between the Arab world and Europe. Libya joined the institute in 1984.

Architecture 

The Architecture-Studio together with Jean Nouvel, won the 1981 design competition. This project is a result of funds from both the League of Arab States and the French government, with the cost of the building totaling around €230,000,000. The building acts as a buffer zone between the Jussieu Campus of Pierre and Marie Curie University (Paris VI), built in large rationalist urban blocks, and the Seine. The river façade follows the curve of the waterway, reducing the hardness of a rectangular grid and offering an inviting view from the Sully Bridge. At the same time the building appears to fold itself back in the direction of the Saint-Germain-des-Prés district.

In contrast to the curved surface on the river side, the southwest façade is an uncompromisingly rectangular glass-clad curtain wall. It faces a large square public space that opens in the direction of the Île de la Cité and Notre Dame. Visible behind the glass wall, a metallic screen unfolds with moving geometric motifs. The motifs are actually 240 photo-sensitive motor-controlled apertures, or shutters, which act as a sophisticated brise soleil that automatically opens and closes to control the amount of light and heat entering the building from the sun. The mechanism creates interior spaces with filtered light — an effect often used in Islamic architecture with its climate-oriented strategies. The innovative use of technology and success of the building's design catapulted Nouvel to fame and is one of the cultural reference points of Paris.

The building was the recipient of the 1989 Aga Khan Award for Architectural Excellence. Jury members included historian Oleg Grabar.

Presidents
Jean Basdevant (1979–1980)
Philippe Ardant (1980–1985)
Pierre Guidoni (1985–1986)
Paul Carton (1986–1988)
Edgard Pisani (1988–1995)
Camille Cabana (1995–2002)
Denis Bauchard (2002–2004)
Yves Guéna (2004–2007)
Dominique Baudis (2007–2009)
Dominique Baudis and Bruno Levallois (2009–2011)
Renaud Muselier and Bruno Levallois (2011–2013)
Jack Lang (2013–present)

Museum 

Within the museum are objects from the Arab world ranging from before Islam through into the twentieth century. One of the main initiatives within the museum is the inclusion of special exhibitions.

Special exhibitions 
 1991 Fahrelnissa Zeid as part of the Trois Femmes Peintres exhibition. 

 2016
 Osiris: The Submerged Mysteries of Egypt
 Voices of animals: the fables of Kalila and Dimna
 Nomadic Sculpture by Rodolphe Hammadi
 First biennial of contemporary Arab photography
 CoeXist

 2017
 'Masterpieces of Modern and Contemporary Arab Art' by the Barjeel Art Foundation

In popular culture
Michel Houellebecq sets a pivotal scene in his novel Submission at a reception held in the Institute's rooftop restaurant and terrace.

Awards
In 2018, the Arab World Institute won the Cultural Personality of the Year from the Sheikh Zayed Book Award.

See also 

 List of museums in Paris
 List of foreign cultural institutes in Paris
 Grand Projets 
 Quai Branly
 Louvre Abu Dhabi

References

External links
Official website 

Arabs in France
Buildings and structures in Paris
Buildings and structures in the 5th arrondissement of Paris
Arab organizations
Jean Nouvel buildings
Research institutes established in 1980
Museums in Paris
Islamic museums